Raymond Gérôme (17 May 1920 — 3 February 2002) was a Belgian-born, French stage and screen actor.

Gérôme was born as Raymond Joseph Léon De Backer in Koekelberg. He made his first stage appearance in 1946, in a stage production of Jeanne d'Arc au bûcher and he entered films in 1954. He is best known to English speaking audiences for his roles as The Commander in The Brain and Inspector Renard in The Greengage Summer. In later life, he lent his voice to dubbing - he provided the voice of Governor Ratcliffe in the French release of Pocahontas.

In 1982 he was awarded a Pix du Brigadier for his performance in L'Extravagant Mister Wilde.

Gérôme died in 2002, at his home in Les Lilas.

Selected filmography

1954: One Step to Eternity - Un client de la boîte
1955: L'Affaire des poisons - Le roi Louis XIV (uncredited)
1957: Élisa - Villedieu
1957: Méfiez-vous fillettes - Jacques
1957: Mademoiselle and Her Gang - L'avocat
1957: Dangerous Exile - Citizen-Director of the Revolution
1960: Murder at 45 R.P.M. - Le commissaire
1961: La Princesse de Clèves - Le Roi
1961: The Greengage Summer - Inspector Renard
1961: Goodbye Again - Jimmy (uncredited)
1961: Le Cœur battant - Pierre
1961: Napoleon II, the Eagle - Apponyi
1961: The Triumph of Michael Strogoff 
1962: La Dénonciation - Patrice de Laborde
1962: Le Masque de fer - Pimentel
1965: Dis-moi qui tuer - La voix au téléphone (voix seulement) (voice)
1966: La seconde vérité - Le juge
1967: The Night of the Generals - Colonel (War Room)
1967: Lettre à Carla 
1968: A Little Virtuous - Kerman
1969: The Brain - The Commander 
1969: Under the Sign of the Bull - Jérôme Laprade - le beau-frère d'Albert
1970: Tropic of Cancer - M. Le Censeur
1970: Céleste - Le chef des barbouzes français
1971: The Deadly Trap - Commissaire Chameille
1972: Travels with My Aunt - Mario
1973: La belle affaire - Genève
1973: Le complot - Vignaud
1973: The Day of the Jackal - Flavigny
1973: A Slightly Pregnant Man - Gérard Chaumont de Latour
1973: Un ange au paradis - Basset
1973: Le Magnifique - General Pontaubert
1975: Divine - Le garçon de café
1977: Le portrait de Dorian Gray - Lord Henry Wotton
1977: Tendre poulet - Director of Criminal Division
1977: Animal - Count of Saint-Prix
1978: L'Exercice du pouvoir - Georges Argand
1980: The Umbrella Coup - President of RG 
1981: Julien Fontanes, magistrat - Jean-Claude Lorentzen
1988: Let Sleeping Cops Lie - Cazalieres
1989: La Révolution française - Jacques Necker (segment "Années Lumière, Les")
1991: L'Opération Corned-Beef - Ghislain Chauffereau
1991: Money - Morf
2000: Sade - President of Maussane (final film role)

French dubbing
1963: The Pink Panther - Tucker
1964: My Fair Lady - Professor Higgins 
1967: Doctor Dolittle - Doctor Dolittle
1968: The Devil Rides Out - Duke de Richleau
1973: Live and Let Die - Tee Hee
1978: Watership Down - General Woundwort
1986: Big Trouble in Little China - Lo Pan
1989: The Return of the Musketeers - Count de Rochefort
1991: Robin Hood: Prince of Thieves - Sheriff of Nottingham 
1991: An American Tail: Fievel Goes West - Cat R. Waul 
1992: Tom and Jerry: The Movie - Lickboot 
1995: Pocahontas - Governor Ratcliffe
1996: Spy Hard - General Rancor

Bibliography
 Yvan Foucart, Dictionnaire des comédiens français disparus, Éditions cinéma, Mormoiron, 2008, 1185 p.

External links
 
 Lesgensducinema bio

1920 births
2002 deaths
People from Koekelberg
Belgian male film actors
Belgian male television actors
20th-century Belgian male actors
French male film actors
French male television actors
French male voice actors
French male stage actors
Naturalized citizens of France
20th-century French male actors
Belgian emigrants to France